Joseph Elbert Stringfellow (March 10, 1918 – September 16, 1992) was an American football tailback and baseball catcher and first baseman. In football, he played one season with the Detroit Lions of the National Football League (NFL) after being drafted in the twelfth round of the 1942 NFL Draft. He played college football at Mississippi Southern College. He also played minor league baseball in Class A.

During World War II, he served in the United States Army Air Forces and played football for the service team at Maxwell Field. He was also the baseball coach at Gunter Field and Mississippi Southern. In 1950, he was named deputy sheriff of Chatham County, Georgia.

References

External links
Just Sports Stats

1918 births
1992 deaths
American football running backs
Baseball catchers
Baseball first basemen
Detroit Lions players
Players of American football from Mississippi
Southern Miss Golden Eagles football players
Sportspeople from Meridian, Mississippi
United States Army Air Forces personnel of World War II